Virendrasinh Bahadursinh Jadeja is a Bharatiya Janata Party politician from Gujarat.He is member of Gujarat Legislative Assembly from Rapar-06 constituency. He also contested Gujarat Legislative Assembly election in 2017 from Mandvi constituency as candidate of Bharatiya Janata Party, and Won .

He contested 2022 Gujarat Legislative Assembly election from Rapar Assembly constituency as candidate of Bharatiya Janata Party, and won.

References 

Living people
Bharatiya Janata Party politicians from Gujarat
Gujarat MLAs 2017–2022
People from Mandvi
1967 births
Gujarat MLAs 2022–2027